The 2013 Canadian Grand Prix (formally known as the Formula 1 Grand Prix du Canada 2013) was a Formula One motor race that took place on 9 June 2013 at the Circuit Gilles Villeneuve in Montreal, Quebec, Canada. The race was the seventh round of the 2013 season, and marked the 50th running of the Canadian Grand Prix.

After taking pole position, Sebastian Vettel took his and Red Bull's first victory at the Canadian Grand Prix, just over 14 seconds ahead of second-placed Fernando Alonso.

The event was marred by the death of track marshal Mark Robinson, who was run over by a recovery vehicle. The accident happened while marshals were removing the Sauber of Esteban Gutiérrez after the Mexican had spun off during the closing stages of the race. Robinson died later in hospital, and became the first trackside death in Formula One since that of marshal Graham Beveridge at the 2001 Australian Grand Prix.

Report

Background
Tyre supplier Pirelli brought its white-banded medium compound tyre as the harder "prime" tyre and the red-banded supersoft compound tyre as the softer "option" tyre, as opposed to the previous year where soft and supersoft selection were provided.

Qualifying
The three qualifying sessions were held on 8 June. All qualifying was rain-affected.

Q1
Force India's Paul di Resta, Caterham's Charles Pic, Lotus's Romain Grosjean, Marussia's Jules Bianchi and Max Chilton, and Caterham's Giedo van der Garde were all knocked out in Q1.

Q2
Sauber's Nico Hülkenberg, McLaren's Sergio Pérez, Williams' Pastor Maldonado, McLaren's Jenson Button, Sauber's Esteban Gutiérrez, and Ferrari's Felipe Massa were all eliminated in Q2. Massa caused a red flag after crashing into the barriers in turn 3. Williams' Valtteri Bottas became the first rookie driver in 2013 to make it into Q3.

Q3
Red Bull's Sebastian Vettel took pole position for the Canadian Grand Prix with a time of 1:25.425, beating Mercedes' Lewis Hamilton by 0.087 seconds. Williams' Valtteri Bottas was a surprise third. At the time, Williams hadn't scored a single point in their 2013 season.

Kimi Räikkönen and Daniel Ricciardo were given two-place penalties for not lining up in the designated 'fast lane' at the pit exit in the rush to get out after the Q2 red flag. Räikkönen would start from 10th and Ricciardo 11th on the grid.

Race 
Vettel led away at the start with Hamilton trailing in his wake, in turn Hamilton held off his teammate Nico Rosberg, behind them was Mark Webber and Fernando Alonso. At the first round of pit stops Mercedes chose to fit super-softs to Lewis Hamilton while Webber and Alonso fitted the more durable medium tyres and they soon caught and passed Hamilton. However, Webber then damaged his car when lapping the Caterham of Giedo van der Garde, the latter was given a 10-second stop-and-go penalty, Webber continued but was then passed by Alonso. After the second round of pit stops Alonso was again behind Lewis Hamilton but on Lap 63 he passed the Mercedes driver to claim 2nd behind a dominant Vettel, Hamilton held onto 3rd place. Near the end of the race Esteban Gutiérrez spun off and track worker Mark Robinson, who had fallen over trying to pick up a radio he dropped, was run over by the recovery vehicle. He later died from his injuries in hospital, several drivers led tributes to the track worker on Twitter.

Classification

Qualifying

  — Kimi Räikkönen and Daniel Ricciardo were each given a two-place grid penalty for failing to queue in the fast lane at the resumption on the second qualifying session.
  — Romain Grosjean was given a ten-place grid penalty for causing an avoidable accident in the previous race.

Race

  — Esteban Gutiérrez was classified despite retiring as he had completed 90% of the race distance.

Championship standings after the race

Drivers' Championship standings

Constructors' Championship standings

References

External links

Canadian
Grand Prix
Canadian Grand Prix
2010s in Montreal
2013 in Quebec
Grand Prix